Engine House No. 2 and Hook and Ladder No. 9, also known as Jersey Street Firehouse, is a historic fire station located at Buffalo in Erie County, New York.

History 
It was built in 1875 and is a 2 1/2-story, "L"-shaped brick building with a mansard roof in the Second Empire style.  A hook and ladder bay was added in 1897.  The building was rebuilt in 1917 after a fire caused severe damage. The station was active until 1997, when it was closed as part of a consolidation in the Buffalo Fire Department. As of May 2011, the building was occupied by the paving contractor Beartooth Industries, LLC.

It was listed on the National Register of Historic Places in 2011.

References

External links
Buffalo as an Architectural Museum

Fire stations completed in 1897
Fire stations completed in 1875
Buildings and structures in Buffalo, New York
Fire stations on the National Register of Historic Places in New York (state)
Second Empire architecture in New York (state)
Defunct fire stations in New York (state)
National Register of Historic Places in Buffalo, New York
Buffalo Fire Department